Vettismorki is an old mountain farm located just above the waterfall Vettisfossen in the Utladalen valley in Årdal Municipality in Vestland county, Norway. Today, Vettismorki is a popular rest stop when walking along the trails in the Utladalen Landscape Protection Area and in Jotunheimen National Park. The cabin Ingjerdbu is owned and run by the Vetti family and is accessible for members of the Norwegian Trekking Association.

References

External links
 Årdal Sogelag 
 Årdalsportalen 
 Den Norske Turistforening 

Årdal
Vettisfossen